Williamsburgh may refer to:

Williamsburgh, a residential area of Paisley, Renfrewshire, Scotland, originally a separate village
Williamsburg, Brooklyn, originally called Williamsburgh from 1802-1855
Rockville, Maryland, called Williamsburgh from 1784-1803
Williamsburg, Michigan, originally called Williasmburgh
Williamsburgh, North Carolina

See also 
Williamsburg (disambiguation)